Amb is a village in Khyber Pakhtunkhwa province of Pakistan. It lies on the west bank of the Indus River and now completely submerged under Tarbela Dam is mainly inhabited by the Tanoli tribe of Ghilzai Descent

Formerly part of the princely state of Amb, which was named after the town, the town of Amb was integrated into Pakistan in 1969. Historically, Nawabs of Amb used to reside in Amb in the winter season.

References

Populated places in Peshawar District